Public Service Commission may refer to:

 Public utilities commission
 Alabama Public Service Commission
 Public Service Commission (Indiana)
 Public Service Commission of Utah
 Public Utilities Commission of Ohio
 Public Utilities Commission of Sri Lanka
 Public Utility Commission of Texas
 Civil service commission
Australian Public Service Commission
 Bangladesh Public Service Commission
 Public Service Commission of Canada
 Public Services Commission of Ghana
 Public Service Commission (Hong Kong)
 Public service commissions in India, state and central commissions
 Union Public Service Commission, central governmental recruiting agency for the civil services of India
 Public Service Commission (Kenya)
 Public Services Commission of Malaysia
 Public Service Commission (Nepal)
 Public Service Commission (New Zealand)
 Public Service Commission (Singapore)
 Public Service Commission (Sri Lanka)
 Federal Public Service Commission (Pakistan)